John Eston (fl. 1400s (decade) - 1420s) was a Canon of Windsor from 1406 to 1422.

Career

He was appointed:
Prebendary of East Marden in Chichester

He was appointed to the eighth stall in St George's Chapel, Windsor Castle in 1406 and held the canonry until 1422.

Notes 

Canons of Windsor
15th-century English clergy